Musafirkhana is a town and tehsil in Amethi district in Indian state of Uttar Pradesh. The word "Musafirkhana" means "Sarai," or "Dharamshala". Musafirkhana is located 32 km northwest of Amethi, 20 km from Jagdishpur. Gauriganj and Amethi are accessible from Musafirkhana via roadways; the nearest railway station is the Musafirkhana railway station on the Lucknow–Varanasi rail route via Sultanpur, and the nearest airport is the Amausi airport.  It is surrounded by more than 100 villages. The town is between 26.37° north latitude and 81.8° east longitude at a height of 102 metres (434 feet) above mean sea level.

As of 2011, Musafirkhana's population is 7,999 people, in 1,276 households. The city is located on the road from Lucknow to Jaunpur, with other roads branching off to Isauli, Jamo, Gauriganj, and Amethi.

Geography
It has an average elevation of 102 metres (334 feet).

It belongs to the Faizabad division. It is located 35 km towards west from the  Sultanpur. It is a tehsil headquarter.

Dadra(3 km),Bisara Paschim (2 km), Dharauli (2 km), Pure Prem Shah (3 km), Pindara Karnai (3 km), Kasthuni Paschim (3 km) are some nearby villages of Musafirkhana. Musafirkhana is surrounded by Baldirai Tehsil towards the East, Milkipur Tehsil towards the East, Shahgarh Tehsil towards the South, and Jamo Tehsil towards the West.

Amethi, Sultanpur, Faizabad, Ayodhya are nearby cities to Musafirkhana.	

It is on the border of the Sultanpur District and Faizabad District, with the latter toward the North.

History
At the turn of the 20th century, Musafirkhana was described as a small and run-down village that was of no importance besides being the tehsil headquarters. Why it was chosen as the seat of a tehsil is unclear — it was originally all the way in the corner of the tehsil, and was possibly chosen so that officials could keep an eye on the Kandu nala, which was formerly affected by bandits and dacoits.

Musafirkhana was originally a bazar — or rather sarai, as the name indicates — built on the village lands of Bhanauli. Their combined population in 1901 was 2,058, a quarter of whom were Muslims. At that time, Musafirkhana had a police station, pound, school, and dispensary.

Demographics

As of 2011 Indian Census, Musafirkhana had a total population of 7,999, of which 4,143 were males and 3,856 were females. Population within the age group of 0 to 6 years was 1,018. The total number of literates in Musafirkhana was 5,876, which constituted 73.5% of the population with male literacy of 79.7% and female literacy of 66.7%. The effective literacy rate of 7+ population of Musafirkhana was 84.2%, of which male literacy rate was 91.2% and female literacy rate was 76.6%. The Scheduled Castes population was 414 respectively. Musafirkhana had 1276 households in 2011.

According to the Census of India conducted in 2001, Musafirkhana had a population of 7,373. Males constituted 53% of the population and females 47%. Musafirkhana has an average literacy rate of 66%, higher than the national average of 59.5%: male literacy is 75%, and female literacy is 57%. In Musafirkhana, 15% of the population is under 6 years of age.

The official languages of speak Musafirkhana are Hindi and Urdu.

Pincodes of Musafirkhana tehsil
 Musafirkhana - 227813  
 Pindara - 227807

Temples
 Mahadevan Temple
 Baba Nand Mahar is Yadav's temple in memory of Krishna. It is believed that God Krishna had arrived there in his childhood. This temple is famous for Yadav's worship to his local cast god Rajabali and Pawaria. Every Tuesday, people come with milk to worship Krishna in the temple. Every year a large fair is held in the temple, on the Hindi month of Kartik (Ashwin) Purnima.  It is important to note that Yadavs from different districts (Amethi, Faizabad, Bahraich, Gonda, Ambedkarnagar, Pratapgarh, Raibareli, Barabanki) and other surrounding villages usually come here and worship the gods Rajabali and Pawaria.
 Durgan Bhawani is the temple of Durga and Hanuman.
 Santoshi Mata temple is the temple of Santoshi, 6 km from Musafirkhana on the Jamon road. TheSantoshi Mata Temple is in Tiwari ka purwa, Barehati village. Every Friday, people come and wish for their wellness and blessings.
 The Maa Hinglaj temple, Baba Purushottam Das temple, Khaki Baba temple, Phoolmati Mata temple (in Poorab Pati) and Bhoodhe Baba (Prem Nagar) are renowned temples of the village Dadra which is located 5 km from Musafirkhana. The Maa Hinglaj temple is a very famous temple and is about 500 years old.

Transport

Musafirkhana has a railway station (500 meters from its center location), which falls on the Varanasi-Lucknow rail route. There is connectivity of Musafirkhana from the capital of UP i.e. Lucknow by bus or train.

Airports
 Ayodhya Airport (71 km)
 Raebareli Airport (distanced approximately 44 km)
 Lucknow Airport (distanced approximately 100 km)
 Allahabad Bamrauli Airport (distanced approximately 100 km)
 Bakshi Ka Talab Airport (distanced approximately 110 km) 
 Kanpur Chakeri Airport (distanced approximately 140 km)

Villages
Musafirkhana CD block has the following 87 villages:

References

Places India